John J. Fitzgerald (1866 – December 20, 1892), also known as Warren B. Fitzgerald, was an American Major League Baseball player who pitched one season in the Majors with the 1890 Rochester Broncos.  He pitched in a total of 11 games, started all of them, and completed eight.  He struck out 35 batters in 78 innings pitched.

References

External links

1866 births
1892 deaths
19th-century baseball players
Major League Baseball pitchers
Rochester Broncos players
Akron Acorns players
Wilkes-Barre Barons (baseball) players
Rochester Jingoes players
Baseball players from Connecticut